Varis is a given name and surname.

Varis may also refer to:
Varis, Grevena, Greek village
Varis, a treatment planning system by Varian Medical Systems

See also

Vari (disambiguation)